The TAI T625 Gökbey is a twin-engined light transport/utility helicopter developed by Turkish Aerospace Industries. Turkey's Undersecretariat for Defence Industries plans to offer the new platform to Turkish Armed Forces and cooperating nations.

Design and development
Turkish Aerospace Industries launched preliminary design studies in 2010. The project commenced in 2013 when Undersecretariat for Defence Industries signed a contract with the Turkish Aerospace Industries to develop a 6-ton class multi-role helicopter for land operations. Alp Aviation is responsible for production and assembly of landing gear, gearbox and dynamic components, while Spanish CESA was selected to supply hydraulic systems.

The T625 is expected to weigh 5 tonnes and is in the interim powered by two LHTEC CTS800 engines. The CTS800 was chosen due to commonality with the TAI/AgustaWestland T129. TUSAS Engine Industries has developed a next generation indigenous powerplant for the T625 named the TEI TS1400. First delivery of TEI TS1400 happened on December 5, 2020.

The T625 features a four-axis dual redundant automatic flight control system, along with an ASELSAN glass cockpit with two wide touchscreen Integrated Mission Displays (8x20 inches) and two touchscreen data entry Touch Command Control Units (8x10 inches). It is designed for IFR and VFR single pilot operations, night operations and flight in known icing conditions. 
The Turkish Presidency of Defense Industries has confirmed that it has obtained a multitude of patents for various sub-systems used in the T625.

On 6 September 2018, the prototype, registered TC-HLP, conducted its maiden flight at Ankara.

Specifications

See also

References

External links

 TAI T625 website

Proposed aircraft of Turkey
Turkish helicopters
Turkish Aerospace Industries aircraft
Aircraft first flown in 2018